Florian Idenburg (born 1975, Haarlem) is a Dutch architect and co-founder of the award-winning architectural design firm SO – IL in New York City.

Education and early career

Idenburg studied architecture at the Delft University of Technology in the Netherlands, receiving a MSc. in Architectural Engineering in 1999. From 2000 to 2007, Idenburg served as Associate at SANAA, where he was in charge of the design and realization of two internationally acclaimed museums (the Glass Pavilion at the Toledo Museum of Art and the New Museum of Contemporary Art in New York).

Professional life

After successful completion of the New Museum with SANAA in 2008 he established SO – IL with Jing Liu in New York.  In 2010, the firm won the MoMA PS1 Young Architects Program with Pole Dance a highly experimental and interactive structure installation. They went on to design a residence for designer Ivan Chermayeff in upstate New York, a wedding chapel in Nanjing, China, the Flockr outdoor exhibition space in Beijing, and the AIA New York award-winning Kukje Gallery in Seoul. In 2012 and 2013, SO – IL was commissioned to design the inaugural presence for the Frieze fair in New York City. Working with a prefabricated rental tent structure forced them to be inventive with a limited vocabulary. Pie-shaped tent section wedges bend the otherwise straight tent into a meandering, supple, shape. The winding form animates it on the unusual waterfront site, as well as establishing the temporary structure as an icon along the water. In Spring 2013, SO – IL won a competition to design the new Jan Shrem and Maria Manetti Shrem Museum of Art at the University of California at Davis.

In 2015, Idenburg and Jing Liu curated Landscapes of the Hyperreal: Ábalos&Herreros selected by SO – IL at the Canadian Centre for Architecture.

Academic life
Idenburg is Associate Professor of Practice at the Graduate School of Design at Harvard and has taught studios at Columbia as well. He has held the Brown-Forman Chair in Urban Design at the University of Kentucky (2010), and has been a visiting lecturer at Princeton University (2007). In 2010, Idenburg won the Dutch Charlotte Köhler Award.

Florian Idenburg lives in Brooklyn, New York, with his wife and two daughters.

Notable projects 

 Amant Foundation Art Gallery, Brooklyn, NY (Ongoing)
 Site Verrier, Meisenthal, France (Ongoing)
 Las Americas Social Housing, Leon, Mexico (2021)
 Breathe – MINI Living, Milan, Italy (2017)
 Jan Shrem and Maria Manetti Shrem Museum of Art, Davis, CA, USA (2016)
 Kukje Gallery—K3, Seoul, South Korea (2012)
 Frieze Art Fair, NY, New York, USA (2012)
 Pole Dance, NY, New York, USA (2010)

Exhibitions

Awards 

 MoMA PS1 Young Architects Program (2009)

References

External links
SO - IL website

1975 births
Living people
Architects from New York City
Artists from Haarlem
Columbia University faculty
Delft University of Technology alumni
Harvard University faculty
University of Kentucky faculty
People from Brooklyn
20th-century Dutch architects
21st-century American architects
21st-century Dutch architects